Val Thorens is a ski town in the Tarentaise Valley in the French Alps at an altitude of . It is located in the commune of Saint-Martin-de-Belleville in the Savoie department. The resort forms part of the Les Trois Vallées ski area which, with over 600 km of slopes, is one of the largest linked ski areas in the world.

Resort
In 1971 the first of three drag lifts was installed, followed in 1972 by the opening of the first ski school.

Skiing
The resort is usually open from mid-November until early May. The highest ski-able peaks are Pointe du Bouchet (3230 m) and Cime de Caron (3200 m).

Many of the slopes in Val Thorens face north and north-west. However, the resort itself faces south. Val Thorens has a total of 68 marked runs, and several terrain parks. The main snow park hosts a stage of the national SFR Slopestyle Tour, and the ski cross arena is frequently visited by the FIS Skier X World Cup.

Val Thorens is part of the 3 vallées ski domain, which is connected by a common ski pass.

Summer skiing
Beginning in 1973 Val Thorens operated ski lifts all year round on the Peclet glacier. Low visitations and melting glacier concerns led to a complete removal by 2002.

Lift system

Val Thorens has 31 lifts, which include magic carpets, draglifts, chairlifts, gondolas, funitels and a cable car.

Notable persons
Christine Goitschel
Adrien Theaux
Jean-Frédéric "JF" Chapuis
Chloé Trespeuch

Sports competitions

Tour de France
The resort hosted a Tour de France stage finish in 1994. Nelson Rodríguez of Colombia won the stage, which had the second highest elevation for a stage finish in the history of the Tour de France.

The Tour de France returned to Val Thorens for the Stage 20 finish on 27 July 2019 and won by Vincenzo Nibali.

Ski competitions
In December 2017, Val Thorens is host city for snowboard cross during the 2017–18 FIS Snowboard World Cup.

See also
List of highest towns by country
List of ski areas and resorts in Europe

References

External links

 Official Val Thorens website

Ski areas and resorts in France
Tourist attractions in Savoie
Sports venues in Savoie